The cattle tyrant (Machetornis rixosa) is a species of bird in the tyrant-flycatcher family Tyrannidae. In Brazil, it is called suiriri-cavaleiro. It is the only member of the genus Machetornis. The relationships of this species and genus to other genera in the tyrant flycatchers are uncertain. It resembles Tyrannus flycatchers, but this may be the result of convergence. Three subspecies are recognised, the nominate race, M. r. flavigularis and M. r. obscurodorsalis, although the latter two may not be distinct from M. r. flavigularis. The genus name was given to the species by George Robert Gray and is derived from the Ancient Greek makhētēs for fighter and ornis for bird, a reference to its pugnacious behaviour and habit of dispossessing other species of their nests. The specific name comes from the Latin rixosus meaning quarrelsome, again referring to the behaviour and temperament of the species.

Distribution and habitat
The species has a disjunct distribution, with the nominate race breeding from northern Argentina and Bolivia to the north-eastern tip of Brazil, and the two other subspecies ranging from Panama to Venezuela and eastern Ecuador. The species inhabits drier open and semi-open habitats, and avoided forested and wooded areas. It can be found in savannah, pastureland, parkland, agricultural land and even gardens. Due to deforestation, the species has recently colonized areas where it was previously absent, such as northeast Ecuador.

Description
The plumage of the nominate subspecies is mostly olive-brown above and yellow below. The head is grey with a thin eyestripe and a white throat. The thin bill and legs are black. The two other subspecies vary from the nominate in having a yellow throat.

Behavior
Cattle tyrants feed on insects, mostly from the ground. It may follow cattle or other large animals for some distance, catching flushed prey, or even hitch rides on these animals, and then snatching flushed prey with a quick sally-flight. It may sometimes hawk for insects from a high perch. The species is sometimes reported to have a cleaning symbiosis with the large mammals it lives with. It takes ticks off mammals only occasionally, but it will sometimes hunt horseflies attempting to land on capybaras.

Cattle tyrants build bulky nests or steal the nests of rufous-fronted thornbirds. 3 to 4 eggs are laid and incubated for 14 days. The chicks fledge after 15 days.

References

External links

 

cattle tyrant
Birds of South America
cattle tyrant
Taxa named by Louis Jean Pierre Vieillot
Taxonomy articles created by Polbot